The 2018 Mid-American Conference baseball tournament was held from May 23 through 27.  The top six regular season finishers of the league's ten teams met in the double-elimination tournament held at Sprenger Stadium in Avon, Ohio.  Kent State won the tournament to earn the conference's automatic bid to the 2018 NCAA Division I baseball tournament.

Seeding and format
The top six teams were seeded according to conference winning percentage.  Teams then played a double-elimination tournament with the top two seeds each receiving a single bye. After the first round, the top seed faced the lowest remaining seed in the winners' bracket. Kent State earned the top seed, while Miami was second, earning the tie over Ball State by taking two of three from the Cardinals during the regular season.

Results

References

Tournament
Mid-American Conference Baseball Tournament
Mid-American Conference baseball tournament
Mid-American Conference baseball tournament